is a common Japanese given name and can be given to either sex.

Possible writings
惟美, meaning "Considerate beauty" 
真己, meaning "True self" or "Truth, Snake"
昌美, meaning "Prosperous beauty" 
雅美, meaning "Gracious beauty" 
成美, meaning "Become beautiful"
マサミ in (katakana)
まさみ in (hiragana)

People with the name
Masami Akita (秋田 昌美), Japanese Noise musician
Masami Anno, Japanese director of the anime series Chūka Ichiban! which is based on the manga series of the same name
Masami Hirosaka (広坂 正美), Japanese radio-controlled car racer
Masami Horiuchi (堀内 正美), Japanese actor
, Japanese alpine skier
Masami Kikuchi (菊池 正美), Japanese voice actor
Masami Kobayashi (小林仁, 1890-1977), admiral in the Imperial Japanese Navy during World War II
Masami Kubota, Japanese former gymnast who competed in the 1956 Summer Olympics
Masami Kurumada (車田 正美), Japanese writer and manga artist known for his works such as Ring ni Kakero, Fūma no Kojirō, Saint Seiya, and  B't X
Masami Kuwashima (桑島 正美), Japanese former racecar driver
Masami Mitsuoka (光岡昌美), Japanese pop singer
Masami Nagasawa (長澤 まさみ), Japanese TV drama and movie actress
Masami Ōbari (大張正己), Japanese anime character designer and director
Masami Odate (大館 昌美), Japanese professional wrestler
Masami Okui (奥井 雅美), Japanese pop musician
Masami Shiratama (白玉 雅己), Japanese musical composer and former bass guitarist for the band Porno Graffitti
Masami Suzuki (鈴木 真仁), voice actress from Japan
, Japanese football manager
Masami Tanaka (田中 雅美), Olympic bronze medalist
Masami Teraoka, Japanese-American watercolor artist who mimics the style of traditional Japanese wood-block prints
Masami Tsuchiya, Japanese singer-songwriter and musician
Masami Tsuda (津田 雅美), Japanese manga artist; creator of Kare Kano
Masami Yoshida (disambiguation), multiple people
Masami Yūki (ゆうきまさみ), Japanese manga artist; creator of Patlabor

Fictional characters
Masami Eiri (英利 政美), villain from the anime Serial Experiments Lain
Masami Kaida, a character in the air combat video game The Sky Crawlers: Innocent Aces
Masami Oyamada (小山田雅美), from the manga and anime Someday's Dreamers
Masami Saotome (早乙女正美), from the live action film: Boogiepop and Others
Masami Yamada (山田 正臣), teacher from the anime Onegai Teacher
Masami Aomame, the full name of the lead female protagonist in Haruki Murakami's novel, 1Q84
Masami Yoshida the wealthy daughter of the Rainbow Factory Owner from The Amazing World of Gumball
 Masami Fujii, a character in the manga/anime series Ro-Kyu-Bu!
Masami Iwasawa (岩沢雅美), the original lead vocalist and rhythm guitarist of Girls Dead Monster from the anime Angel Beats!
 Masami, the "kid" in Samurai of Hyuga

See also
Japanese name
Japanese language

Japanese unisex given names